Pelican Lake is an unincorporated community located in Oneida County, Wisconsin, United States. Pelican Lake is located on the eastern shore of Pelican Lake and is served by U.S. Route 45, in the town of Schoepke. Pelican Lake has a post office with ZIP code 54463.

Community groups include the Pelican Lake Property Owners Association and the Pelican Lake Chamber of Commerce.

Images

References

External links
Pelican Lake Area Chamber of Commerce
Pelican Lake Property Owners Association

Unincorporated communities in Oneida County, Wisconsin
Unincorporated communities in Wisconsin